Vignogn is a former municipality in the district of Surselva in the canton of Graubünden in Switzerland.  The municipalities of Cumbel, Degen, Lumbrein, Morissen, Suraua, Vignogn, Vella, and Vrin merged on 1 January 2013 into the new municipality of Lumnezia.

History
Vignogn is first mentioned in 1325 as Vinanne.  In 1469 it was mentioned as Viends.

Geography
Of this area, 57.4% is used for agricultural purposes, while 31.3% is forested. Of the rest of the land, 2.7% is settled (buildings or roads) and the remainder (8.6%) is non-productive (rivers, glaciers or mountains).

The former municipality is located in the Lugnez sub-district of the Surselva district. Until 1983 Vignogn was known as Vigens.

Demographics
Vignogn had a population (as of 2011) of 170.  , 0.6% of the population was made up of foreign nationals.  Over the last 10 years the population has decreased at a rate of -14%.  Most of the population speaks Romansh (88.8%), with German being second most common (10.1%) and French being third ( 0.6%).

, the gender distribution of the population was 53.0% male and 47.0% female.  The age distribution, in Vignogn is; 11 children or 6.1% of the population are between 0 and 9 years old and 21 teenagers or 11.7% are between 10 and 19.  Of the adult population, 26 people or 14.5% of the population are between 20 and 29 years old.  13 people or 7.3% are between 30 and 39, 22 people or 12.3% are between 40 and 49, and 37 people or 20.7% are between 50 and 59.  The senior population distribution is 27 people or 15.1% of the population are between 60 and 69 years old, 8 people or 4.5% are between 70 and 79, there are 11 people or 6.1% who are between 80 and 89,and there are 3 people or 1.7% who are between 90 and 99.

In the 2007 federal election the most popular party was the CVP which received 71.4% of the vote.  The next three most popular parties were the SVP (13.4%), the FDP (8.7%) and the SP (6.5%).

In Vignogn about 55.1% of the population (between age 25-64) have completed either non-mandatory upper secondary education or additional higher education (either university or a Fachhochschule).

Vignogn has an unemployment rate of 1.06%.  , there were 36 people employed in the primary economic sector and about 15 businesses involved in this sector.  8 people are employed in the secondary sector and there are 3 businesses in this sector.  18 people are employed in the tertiary sector, with 8 businesses in this sector.

The historical population is given in the following table:

Notable residents
 Carmen Casanova, Women's Alpine Skier (born 1980 in Vignogn)

References

External links

 Official website 
 

Lumnezia
Former municipalities of Graubünden